Siddhartha Vikram Lal (born October 1973) is an Indian businessman. He is the son of Vikram Lal, and a former chief executive officer (CEO) and the current managing director (MD) of Eicher Motors, a director of Eicher Goodearth Limited and chairman and MD of VE Commercial Vehicles. Lal is credited with the turnaround and revival of Royal Enfield

Early life and education
Siddhartha Vikram Lal is the son of Vikram Lal, who was the chief executive officer of Eicher Motors. Like his father, Siddhartha attended The Doon School for his secondary education. After completing twelfth grade, Lal attended the St. Stephen's College of University of Delhi for a bachelor's degree in economics in the 1994. Between 1996 and 1998, he attained a postgraduate diploma in mechanical engineering from Cranfield University, and a master's degree in automotive engineering from the University of Leeds in England. He has a sister, Simran Lal.

Career
Lal, after completing his education started working with MAN Nutzfahrzeuge AG. He joined Eicher Group in 1999, working in various capacities in the Eicher tractor division, and then became CEO of Royal Enfield in 2000 (at the age of 26) aiming to end the unit's losses. From 2000 to 2004, he worked out of Royal Enfield's headquarters in Chennai, introducing cost-cutting measures and product upgrades. "Honestly, at age 26, it seemed a fun thing to do. I could eat, sleep, ride and talk motorcycles," Lal said in a 2015 interview.

In Jan 2004, Lal was appointed as the chief operating officer (COO) of Eicher Motors. In May 2006, Lal took over as the CEO and MD of Eicher Motors.

Positions held

Personal life
Siddhartha Lal relocated from Delhi to London, in August 2015, in order to be close to Royal Enfield's new R&D centre in Leicestershire. "We are in the process of developing engines for the international markets and lots of developmental work is happening in the UK. It is for that I have decided to move to the UK for one year," he said.

References 

1973 births
Alumni of the University of Leeds
Alumni of Cranfield University
Businesspeople from Delhi
Living people
St. Stephen's College, Delhi alumni
The Doon School alumni
Indian chief operating officers
Punjabi people
Eicher Motors